To Force a Fate is the second album by indie rock band The Reputation, their first for Lookout! Records.  It was released in the spring of 2004.

"March" was co-written by Elizabeth Elmore and John Davis of Q and Not U for an unrealized collaborative project called Cosmopolitan.

The album is unique to other Elmore projects in that the original songs were not written and sung by her alone.  "Follow-Through Time" was co-written by then-Reputation bass player Joel Root, and "The Lasting Effects" features vocals by guitarist Sean Hulet.

Track listing
 "Let This Rest" – 4:15
 "Bottle Rocket Battles" – 2:59
 "Follow-Through Time" – 3:57
 "Face It" – 3:09
 "The Lasting Effects" – 3:48
 "March" – 2:53
 "Cartography" – 4:45
 "Some Senseless Day"  – 3:39
 "The Ugliness Kicking Around" – 5:44
 "Bone-Tired" – 4:07

References

The Reputation albums
2004 albums
Lookout! Records albums